Marian Patricia Bell (born 28 October 1957) is a British consultant economist, and was a member of the Bank of England's Monetary Policy Committee from June 2002 to June 2005.

Education
She was educated at Heriots Wood Grammar School, Harrow; Hertford College, Oxford (BA Philosophy, Politics and Economics) and Birkbeck, University of London (MSc Economics).

Career
Bell was at the London Enterprise Agency from 1980–82, she then joined the Royal Bank of Scotland as an economist from 1982 to 1989. In 1989 Bell joined Her Majesty's Treasury as an economic adviser and in 1991 rejoined the Royal Bank of Scotland where she set up and ran the research function of the treasury and capital markets. From 2000-02 Bell was director of Alpha Economic and from  2002-05 was an external member of the Monetary Policy Committee at the Bank of England appointed by the Chancellor of the Exchequer to set monetary policy. Bell was appointed to the Fiscal Policy Panel States of Jersey from 2007–14 and the International Advisory Council of Zurich Financial Services from 2007. She was on the Fiscal Policy Panel States of Jersey, Channel Islands providing independent advice on fiscal policy from 2010–11, and Governor of the National Institute of Economic and Social Research from 2014. Bell has been the non-executive director of the Emerging Health Threats Forum from 2006–12 and vice-chair of the Contemporary Dance Trust.

In 2005 Bell was appointed a Commander of the Order of the British Empire (CBE) for her services to macroeconomics and fiscal regulation.

Personal life
Bell is married with 2 children.

References

External links
  Governing Board of The Place

Alumni of Hertford College, Oxford
Alumni of Birkbeck, University of London
1957 births
Living people